General elections were held in Costa Rica on 1 February 1998. Miguel Ángel Rodríguez of the Social Christian Unity Party won the presidential election, whilst his party also won the parliamentary election. Voter turnout was 70%, the lowest since the 1950s.

An economic recession, a teachers' strike due to a pensions' reform and some corruption scandals made President José María Figueres' government highly unpopular. Thus, government endorsed candidate José Miguel Corrales tried to distance himself from Figueres as much as possible. Corrales won over former President of Congress Jorge Walter Coto Molina in PLN's primaries but the discovery of Voter fraud damaged PLN's image and split the party. On the contrary in PUSC, previous candidate Miguel Ángel Rodríguez was seen as the natural nominee for this election, and despite the fact that deputy Luis Fishman was rumored as a possible internal opponent, he finally declined and Rodríguez was nominated without the need of primaries, thus keeping the party united. During Figueres' administration the so call  Figueres-Calderón Pact was signed between the leaders of the two main parties (and sons of the two caudillos of the 1948 civil war); him and Rafael Ángel Calderón Fournier (Rodríguez political rival) to approve several mutually beneficial laws for both major parties, something that caused outrage among large segments of the population and started the downfall of the two-party system.

Results

By province

Parliament
The country was for the time still under a heavy two-party system dynamics and the two main parties at the time; National Liberation Party and Social Christian Unity Party won most of the votes. Nevertheless, some third forces also won seats on the Parliament, among them left-wing Democratic Force won two seats. It was also the first time that liberal Libertarian Movement and Christian conservative Costa Rican Renewal won seats (one each) in the Parliament both for their future presidential candidates Otto Guevara and Justo Orozco respectively. The small party National Integration Party led by medic Walter Muñoz won its only seat in history until the 2018 election.

By province

Local governments

References

Costa Rica
1998 in Costa Rica
Elections in Costa Rica